Georges Hebden (19 April 1889 – 23 March 1970) was a Belgian football (soccer) player who competed in the 1920 Summer Olympics. He was a member of the Belgium team, which won the gold medal in the football tournament. Georges played for R.U. Saint-Gilloise and appeared in 211 matches and scored 81 goals.

References

External links
 

1889 births
1970 deaths
Belgian footballers
Footballers at the 1920 Summer Olympics
Olympic footballers of Belgium
Olympic gold medalists for Belgium
Belgium international footballers
Olympic medalists in football
Medalists at the 1920 Summer Olympics
Association football forwards
20th-century Belgian people